Plasmodium lionatum is a species of apicomplexan parasite in the family Plasmodiidae. Like all Plasmodium species P. lionatum has both vertebrate and insect hosts. The vertebrate hosts for this parasite are lizards.

Description 

The parasite was first described by Telford in 1982.

Distribution 
This species is found in Thailand.

Hosts 
The only known host is the flying gecko (Ptychozoon lionatum).

References

Further reading 

lionatum